General Waters may refer to:

John Waters (British Army officer, born 1774) (1774–1842), British Army lieutenant general
John Waters (British Army officer, born 1935) (born 1935), British Army general
John K. Waters (1906–1989), United States Army four-star general